Gombasek Cave or Gombasecká jaskyňa (in Slovak) and  Gombaszögi-barlang (in Hungarian) is a karst cave in the Slovak Karst, Slovakia. It is named after the settlement of Gombasek, which belongs to the village of Slavec. It is located in the Slovak Karst National Park, in the Slaná river valley, approximately 15 km south of Rožňava. The cave was discovered on 21 November 1951 by volunteer cavers. In 1955, 285 m out of 1 525 m were opened to the public. Currently, the route for visitors is 530 m long and takes about 30 minutes.

The cave was also used for "speleotherapy" as a sanatorium, focused on airway diseases. Since 1995, the Gombasek Cave is included in the UNESCO World Heritage list as a part of Caves of Aggtelek Karst and Slovak Karst.

See also
List of caves in Slovakia

External links
Gombasek Cave at Slovakia.travel
Gombasek Cave at Slovak Caves Administration

Show caves in Slovakia
World Heritage Sites in Slovakia
Limestone caves
Geography of Košice Region
Tourist attractions in Košice Region
Caves of Aggtelek Karst and Slovak Karst